Family Tree is a documentary-style television comedy created by Christopher Guest and Jim Piddock.  The series premiered on 12 May 2013, on the American pay television network HBO, and appeared on the British channel BBC Two in July 2013.  Guest, Piddock, Karen Murphy, Deborah Oppenheimer, and Mario Stylianides serve as the show's executive producers.

On 23 January 2014, it was announced that HBO had cancelled the series.

Cast
Chadwick Family
Chris O'Dowd as Tom Chadwick, a young man investigating his lineage.
Nina Conti as Bea Chadwick/Monkey, Tom's sister who uses a hand puppet named "Monk" to communicate her feelings after an embarrassing incident with a puffin in her childhood
Michael McKean, as Keith Chadwick, Tom's father who loves old British situation comedies
Lisa Palfrey, as Luba Chadwick, Keith's Moldovan wife who is extremely eccentric
Christopher Guest as David Chadwick, one of Tom's relatives from North Carolina. He claims to have a vestigial tail (which is hereditary). David had a wife who disappeared under mysterious circumstances three years prior to the events of the series. Guest also plays Phineas Chadwick, David's grandfather who was a musician, art collector, actor and baseball player.
Ed Begley Jr. as Dr. Al Chadwick, Tom's third uncle. He lives in Glendale, California with his wife Kitty. He is a podiatrist (his father's profession also) and is trained in Native American survival tactics. He and his wife love R&B music. He is obsessed with the fact that Charles Chadwick left America just two days after Abraham Lincoln's assassination and is a paranoid conspiracy theorist. Also appears to be wearing a Masonic ring—which would normally indicate a Masonic tie of some sort.
Carrie Aizley as Kitty Chadwick, Al's wife, whom he met when he contacted her from a phone number on a public toilet cubicle. She is dimwitted and ignorant about English culture. She is the inventor of a series of flavored enemas.
Christian Rodska as Graham Chadwick, Keith's cousin who lives in Derbyshire on a farm
Adam James as Ronnie Chadwick, Tom's second cousin who lives and works on a farm in Derbyshire
Susan Earl as Emma Chadwick, Ronnie's wife
Kevin Pollak as Marty Schmelff, one of Tom's relatives who owns a store in Barstow, California. He is related to Tom by Charles Chadwick's marriage to Rebecca Schmelff, a member of a Jewish family in Barstow
Bob Balaban as Melvin Schmelff, Tom's uncle. He is an admirer of his grandfather, Ezra Schmelff, who was a famous Western film actor. Balaban also plays Ezra.

Other Characters
Tom Bennett as Pete Stupples, Tom's immature best friend who works at a zoo in London
Jim Piddock as Glenn Pfister, the eccentric South African owner of "Mr Pfister's Bits & Bobs", an antique and collectibles store in London
Annabel Scholey as Lucy Pfister, a baker and daughter of Mr Pfister. She was recently engaged to be married, but has since split with her (now) ex-fiancé.
Fred Willard as Mike Morton, Al's crude neighbour. He is a lover of magic. It is revealed in the season finale that he is openly gay, and lives with his partner Kim (Michael Mantell)
Matt Griesser as Rick Tillman, Tom's cousin in California. He is a lover of Civil War re-enactments. He lives in Redondo Beach with his girlfriend Julie
Maria Blasucci as Julie Fenneman, Rick's girlfriend
Don Lake as Harvey Krupp, Rick's friend who is a Civil War aficionado.
Barbara Bolton as Mildred Budgens, the best friend and roommate of Tom's great-aunt Victoria who imparts valuable knowledge to Tom about Victoria.
Graham Greene as Chief Running Bull, a resident of a Native American reserve in Barstow.
Saginaw Grant as White Feather, a resident of a Native American reserve in Barstow and friend to Chief Running Bull.
Amy Seimetz as Ally Keele, Tom's love interest whom he meets after he defends her against a man (Will Sasso) in a car accident.
Ben Farrow as Race Course Announcer, provides the commentary on the pantomime horse race.

Production
The series is written by Guest and Piddock and directed by Guest.  The dialogue is improvised by the actors.  The show's first series consisted of 8 episodes. Filming took place in London and Los Angeles.

Music
The closing credits song "I'm Alone But That's OK" is performed by Ron Sexsmith and was written for the series by Christopher Guest and Harlan Collins.

Running jokes
Oddball inventions: Tom's father has invented a shoe tree that can cool or heat up a shoe; a woman whom Tom and Pete meet has invented a glass, attached around her aged mother's neck, that allows her to see if she's still breathing. Kitty Chadwick has invented flavoured enemas.

Awkward dates: Pete sets up Tom on bad first dates. One woman declares that dinosaurs still exist; another is obsessed with bones.

Eccentric hobbies, quirks and obsessions: Tom's sister Bea uses a hand puppet that tends to blurt out sentiments best left unspoken. Tom often talks to neighbour Mr. Pfister, an antique-store owner trying to make "landmarks in a bottle" when he's not checking the website "Is It Fatal?" to see if he suffers from a life-threatening disease. In the first episode, Pfister sends Tom on to Neville St Aubrey, a manic-looking antique photo expert whom Pfister calls "as mad as a box of frogs". In California, Julie, Tom's cousin Rick's girlfriend, is obsessed with owls — she collects owl figurines and owl pillows and draws owls in a notebook. Rick is preoccupied with Civil War re-enactments.

British TV: Tom's father loves to watch DVDs of (fictional) British sitcom, full of broad stereotypes and Carry On-like humour. One, There Goes The Neighbourhood, features an Alf Garnett-like Anglo-Indian. Another, set in a police station, is called Move Along, Please! Tom sees a bit of The Plantagenets, a Tudors-like historical drama, while Pete likes to watch "the new Sherlock Holmes," which parodies Star Trek and is called Sherlock Holmes: The New Frontier.

Episodes

Reception

The British press were more critical of the series than the American.

Sam Wollaston in The Guardian writes that "More seriously for Family Tree, it simply isn't very good. It's not bad, it's just kind of all right...I watched the second episode too. Same same, still no surprises, or lols, or any sort of laughs really.."

Gerard O'Donovan in The Daily Telegraph feels that it "was fine, if not very funny, except when Guest's trademark style came into play and we were expected to believe a TV crew was following Tom around, interviewing him and his pals. Uh, why? Guest's previous films focused on subjects about which documentaries actually do get made – rock groups, dog shows, folk festivals. But a sad, under-motivated nobody pointlessly – and not very credibly – indulging his random curiosity? It just didn't work."

Tom Gliatto, television critic for People Magazine, gives Family Tree 3 1/2 stars and says "It is still a distinctly Guest production: often poky, always charmingly whimsical and, from time to time, so astoundingly funny you seem to have shot into a distant stratosphere of pure comedy."

Tim Goodman of The Hollywood Reporter writes "the half-hour show works its magic the patented Guest way: by slowly, with pinpoint accuracy, drilling down into the absurdist ways of ordinary people.  The series works on multiple levels, but clearly one is O'Dowd's charm... Here's hoping HBO lets Family Tree grow for many seasons."

Rob Sheffield of Rolling Stone writes that "Family Tree is the kind of brilliant achievement only Christopher Guest could attempt, in his signature style of documentary footage and improvised dialogue, loaded with eccentric clods bumbling into moments of sublimely awkward truth."

Robert Lloyd, television critic for the Los Angeles Times, writes "Christopher Guest's poignantly comical HBO series bears the director's distinctively eccentric marks."  He also mentions, "Guest gives the world a quarter-twist toward the ridiculous, without losing sight of the human dreams and strivings, obsessions and accommodations that are his main and constant subject."

Mike Hale of The New York Times writes "As in Mr. Guest's films, its story is less important than the presentation of a gallery of eccentrics, ranging from mildly odd to completely loony." He goes on to say "The so far quiet and modest vibe of the show may shift as well. In any case, more members of the Guest ensemble, including Ed Begley Jr. and Fred Willard, will appear, which can only be a good thing."

Alan Sepinwall, who reviewed the show for HitFix, says "And that's perhaps the most impressive thing about Family Tree: it invites you to laugh at all these kooks in a way that doesn't feel mean-spirited, and it takes parts of its hero's journey quite seriously."

Metacritic gives the series a rating of 74% based on reviews from 28 critics.

References

External links
 
Official website

2010s American mockumentary television series
2013 American television series debuts
2013 American television series endings
2010s British comedy television series
2013 British television series debuts
2013 British television series endings
American television shows featuring puppetry
British television shows featuring puppetry
English-language television shows
HBO original programming
BBC television comedy
Television series about families
Television series by Universal Television